Jean-Pierre Bechter (born 10 November 1944) is a French politician and sub-prefect.

He is a member of the Union for a Popular Movement, and served as  mayor of Corbeil-Essonnes in 2010 and 2014. He is a departmental councilor of Essonne since 2018. He was a deputy of French from 22 April 1986 to 14 May 1988. He was re-elected to the Paris council.

Biography
Jean-Pierre Bechter was born in Ussel, Corrèze, France in 1944. He leads in the 2014 municipal election in Corbeil-Essonnes wins in the second round with 56.52% of the vote. Serge Dassault, who is his substitute, replaced him on the departmental council on September 28. Beaten in 1981 by the communist mayor of Tulle, Jean Combasteil, he returned to the National Assembly on 2 April 1986, replacing Jacques Chirac, appointed prime minister.

References 

1944 births
Living people
Union for a Popular Movement politicians
Rally for the Republic politicians
The Republicans (France) politicians
20th-century French politicians
21st-century French politicians
Sciences Po Aix alumni
Mayors of places in Île-de-France
People from Corrèze